"Stay a Little Longer" is a Western swing dance tune written by Bob Wills and Tommy Duncan. The title comes from a refrain in the chorus:

The song consists of a number of unrelated verses, one of which (verse three) comes from an old folk song"Shinbone Alley":

Bob Wills and the Texas Playboys recorded it in 1945 and it reached number three in 1946. Willie Nelson (number 22 in 1973) and Mel Tillis (number 17 in 1982) also charted Top 40 hits. The song has been recorded numerous times.

In The Andy Griffith Show episode "The Darling Baby", the lyrics went like this:

References

Bibliography
Cohen, Norm. Folk Music: A Regional Exploration. Greenwood Press, 2005. 
Whitburn, Joel. The Billboard Book of Top 40 Country Hits. Billboard Books, 2006. 

Western swing songs
1946 songs
Bob Wills songs
Mel Tillis songs
Willie Nelson songs
Songs written by Bob Wills
Songs written by Tommy Duncan